Titus Markeith Brown (born March 27, 1986) is a former American football linebacker. Played for the Cleveland Browns from 2008-2010, except for a short stint with the Denver Broncos. He was signed by the Miami Dolphins as an undrafted free agent in 2008. He played college football at Mississippi State, where he registered 18.5 career sacks, seventh on MSU's all-time leaderboard.

References

External links

Cleveland Browns bio
Mississippi State Bulldogs bio

1986 births
Living people
Sportspeople from Tuscaloosa, Alabama
Players of American football from Alabama
American football defensive ends
American football linebackers
Mississippi State Bulldogs football players
Miami Dolphins players
Cleveland Browns players
Denver Broncos players